Griset de Forel Castle is a castle in the municipality of Torny of the Canton of Fribourg in Switzerland.  It is a Swiss heritage site of national significance.

See also
 List of castles in Switzerland
 Château

References

Cultural property of national significance in the canton of Fribourg
Castles in the canton of Fribourg